Khersian (also Romanized as Khersīān, Ḩerseyūn, Kherseyūn, and Khersīyūn) is a village in Pishkuh-e Zalaqi Rural District, Besharat District, Aligudarz County, Lorestan Province, Iran. At the 2006 census, its population was 133, in 23 families.

References 

Towns and villages in Aligudarz County